Gabés derby, a football match between the Stade Gabesien and the AS Gabès, is considered the second most important derby in Tunisia.

Followed by many supporters, it is played in Ligue 1 or Ligue 2. The match is important enough to be broadcast on television, as in 2007 when the derby was broadcast live on Canal 21. The derby takes place It the Gabes Olympic Stadium, better known as the Zrig stadium, the name of the neighborhood where it is located.

History 
Stade Gabesien was founded in 1957 and the AS Gabès in 1978. Each of these two teams represents a district of the city: Jara for the Stade Gabesien, El Menzel for the Avenir sportif de Gabès.

The rivalry has a geographical origin, the two clubs evolving in the same city: Gabes. However, it has been exacerbated by the race in Ligue I that the two clubs are engaged in. Many people advocated the merger of the two clubs but it did not happen. The Tunisian press thinks that the creation of a large Gabonese club would create a new football pole in Tunisia, in order to oppose the supremacy of Tunisian clubs.

Stadium 
Stade Municipal de Gabès (Arabic: الملعب البلدي بقابس) is a multi-use stadium in Gabès, Tunisia. It is currently used mostly for football matches and is the home ground of Stade Gabèsien and AS Gabès of the Tunisian Ligue Professionnelle 1. The stadium has a capacity of 15,000 spectators.

Results

References 

AS Gabès
Football competitions in Tunisia
Stade Gabèsien